Lursan Thiamrat (born August 18, 1991) is a Thai professional footballer who plays as an attacking midfielder for Thai League 1 club Sukhothai and the Thailand national team.

International career
In 2022, he was called up by Thailand national team for friendly match against Nepal and Suriname.

Honour
Nongbua Pitchaya
 Thai League 2 Champions : 2020–21

References

External links

1991 births
Living people
Lursan Thiamrat
Lursan Thiamrat
Lursan Thiamrat
Association football midfielders
Lursan Thiamrat
Lursan Thiamrat
Lursan Thiamrat